A potwalloper (sometimes potwalloner or potwaller) or householder borough was a parliamentary borough in which the franchise was extended to the male head of any household with a hearth large enough to boil a cauldron (or "wallop a pot").

Potwallopers existed in the Unreformed House of Commons prior to the Reform Act 1832, and in its predecessors the Irish House of Commons and House of Commons of Great Britain (until 1800) and the House of Commons of England (to 1707).

The potwalloper was one of the widest variants of the borough franchise and the tendency over the centuries was for the franchise to be limited, reducing the number of electors.

English potwalloper boroughs 
From the time of the Restoration, the only English boroughs to elect on a potwalloper or inhabitant franchise were:

 Abingdon (1690–1708, and only if electors were not in receipt of alms)
 Amersham (until 1705; electors in receipt of alms were disfranchised in 1690)
 Ashburton (until 1708)
 Aylesbury (only if electors were not in receipt of alms; after 1804 freeholders living near the town were enfranchised also)
 Bedford (providing electors were not in receipt of alms)
 Callington (required one year's continuous residence. The franchise in this borough was in dispute but both definitions amounted to the same people in practice)
 Cirencester
 Hertford (providing electors were not in receipt of alms; freemen voted as well)
 Hindon (providing electors were not in receipt of alms)
 Honiton (1690–1711 and from 1724, but only if electors were not in receipt of alms)
 Ilchester (from 1702, but only if electors were not in receipt of alms)
 Ludgershall (until 1698)
 Milborne Port (until 1702)
 Minehead
 Mitchell (until 1715, and only if electors were not in receipt of alms)
 Northampton (from 1715)
 Pontefract (from 1783)
 Portsmouth (until 1695)
 Preston (from 1768)
 Reading (until 1708)
 St Germans (one year residency)
 Southwark (until 1702, and only if electors were not in receipt of alms)
 Taunton
 Tregony
 Wendover (providing electors were not in receipt of alms)

Irish potwalloper boroughs 
There were eleven such boroughs in Ireland until the Union with Great Britain in 1801. Ireland also had seven "manor boroughs", in which only freeholders voted. The potwallopers included  Baltimore, Lisburn, Antrim, Swords and Downpatrick, and before Emancipation only non-Roman Catholics could vote.

Quotation 

When Thomas Babington Macaulay complained about the insufficiencies of the suffrage system in the early 19th century, he wrote :

"This is an aristocracy, the principle of which is to invest a hundred drunken potwallopers in one place, or the owner of a ruined hovel in another with powers which are withheld from cities renowned in the furthest ends of the earth."

Thomas Hardy, in his first novel, Desperate Remedies, used the term 

"Ancient pot-wallopers, and thriving shopkeepers, in their intervals of leisure, stood at their shop doors – their toes hanging over the edge of the step, and their obese waists hanging over their toes – and in discourses with friends on the pavement, formulated the course of the improvident, and reduced the children's prospects to a shadow-like attenuation."

Notes 

Constituencies of the Parliament of the United Kingdom